Muricauda beolgyonensis  is a  Gram-negative, rod-shaped and non-motile bacterium from the genus of Muricauda which has been isolated from tidal flat in Korea.

References

External links
Type strain of Muricauda beolgyonensis at BacDive -  the Bacterial Diversity Metadatabase

Further reading 
 

Flavobacteria
Bacteria described in 2012